Matthew McCrane (born September 8, 1994) is an American football placekicker for the DC Defenders of the XFL. He played college football at Kansas State University. He was signed by the Arizona Cardinals as an undrafted free agent in 2018. He has also played for the Oakland Raiders, Pittsburgh Steelers, New York Guardians, and Cleveland Browns.

Early years
McCrane attended and played high school football at Brownwood High School. While playing for the Lions, McCrane converted on 41 of 44 extra points and 7 of 12 field goals, including the longest in school history at 52 yards.

College career
McCrane attended and played college football at Kansas State for head coach Bill Snyder. From 2014 to 2017, he converted 133-of-134 extra point attempts and 57-of-66 field goal attempts. McCrane ranks #2 in Big XII history and #7 in NCAA history for Career Field Goal Percentage. (86.4%)

Collegiate statistics

Professional career

Arizona Cardinals
After going undrafted in the 2018 NFL Draft, McCrane signed with Arizona Cardinals. He was released on September 1, 2018.

Oakland Raiders
McCrane was signed by the Oakland Raiders on September 25, 2018. On September 30, 2018, against the Cleveland Browns, McCrane converted three of five field goal attempts and four extra points. He converted the game winning field goal for the Oakland Raiders in his NFL debut. McCrane was waived by the Raiders on October 23, 2018, after the team signed Daniel Carlson.

Arizona Cardinals (second stint)
McCrane was re-signed by the Cardinals to their practice squad on October 26, 2018. McCrane was released by the Cardinals on October 30, 2018. He was re-signed to the active roster on November 17, 2018, following an injury to Phil Dawson. McCrane handled the kicking duties in the Cardinals' 23–21 loss to the Raiders, making all three of his extra point attempts, and was waived the following day on November 19, 2018.

Pittsburgh Steelers
On December 28, 2018, the Pittsburgh Steelers signed McCrane after placekicker Chris Boswell was placed on injured reserve. McCrane made all three field goal attempts and his sole extra point attempt in the Steelers final regular season game on December 30, 2018, in a 16–13 win against the Cincinnati Bengals. McCrane was released by the Steelers on May 9, 2019.

New York Guardians
McCrane was drafted by the New York Guardians in the 2020 XFL Supplemental Draft on November 22, 2019. He had his contract terminated when the league suspended operations on April 10, 2020.

Cleveland Browns
McCrane was signed to the Cleveland Browns' practice squad on September 22, 2020. McCrane was signed to a reserve/futures contract by the Browns on January 18, 2021. He was waived on May 11, 2021.

Arizona Cardinals (third stint)
On September 16, 2021, McCrane was signed to the Arizona Cardinals practice squad. The Cardinals released him on September 21, 2021.

Philadelphia Eagles
On December 25, 2021, McCrane was signed to the Philadelphia Eagles practice squad. He spent time on and off the practice squad before being released on January 10, 2022.

DC Defenders 
McCrane signed with the DC Defenders on January 17, 2023.

References

External links
Kansas State Wildcats bio
Oakland Raiders bio

1994 births
Living people
People from Brownwood, Texas
Players of American football from Texas
American football placekickers
Kansas State Wildcats football players
Arizona Cardinals players
Oakland Raiders players
Pittsburgh Steelers players
New York Guardians players
Cleveland Browns players
Philadelphia Eagles players
DC Defenders players